Prochlidonia ochromixtana is a species of moth of the  family Tortricidae. It is found in Turkey.

References

Moths described in 1913
Cochylini